The third season of the animated television series My Little Pony: Friendship Is Magic, developed by Lauren Faust, originally aired on The Hub in the United States. The series is based on Hasbro's My Little Pony line of toys and animated works and is often referred by collectors to be the fourth generation, or "G4", of the My Little Pony franchise. Season 3 of the series premiered on November 10, 2012 on The Hub, an American pay television channel partly owned by Hasbro, and concluded on February 16, 2013.

The show follows a studious unicorn pony named Twilight Sparkle as her mentor Princess Celestia guides her to learn about friendship in the town of Ponyville. Twilight becomes close friends with five other ponies: Applejack, Rarity, Fluttershy, Rainbow Dash, and Pinkie Pie. Each represents a different face of friendship, and Twilight discovers herself to be a key part of the magical artifacts, the "Elements of Harmony". The ponies share adventures and help out other residents of Ponyville, while working out the troublesome moments in their own friendships.

Development

Concept 
Season 3 features a broad arc which shows that Twilight has demonstrated positive leadership qualities beyond Celestia's expectations, leading Twilight to be crowned as a new Princess in Equestria and to become an "alicorn" (a pony with both a horn and a pair of wings).

Production 
Season 3 is the first season of the show without input from Lauren Faust, the original creative director of the show who stepped down after the first season and provided creative consulting in the second; instead, production was overseen by Jayson Thiessen, while Meghan McCarthy was the lead writer for the series, who both shared the role of executive producer from Season 4 onwards.

A sneak peek of two future songs in Season 3, "The Failure Song" and "The Ballad of the Crystal Empire" (both from the first episode), was unveiled at the 2012 San Diego Comic-Con. Part of a continuing plot in this season is a journey that Twilight Sparkle undertakes that ultimately leads to her to be named a Princess in the season finale, which includes becoming an alicorn. Meghan McCarthy said that the intent was to show that they were building a "unique mythology around being a princess", and to show girls that while they cannot be princesses themselves, they can live to the ideals of one by "shar[ing] the gifts that they have been given with others". 

As of Season 3, the song titles make their appearance in the closing credits, along with the names of the composer (Daniel Ingram) and lyricist. In addition, only the voice actors who take part in a particular episode are listed in the credits, along with all of their main/secondary roles. During the first two seasons, every episode credited only the same core group of actors and their main roles, whether they had speaking lines or not.

Cast

Main 
 Tara Strong as Twilight Sparkle (speaking voice)
 Rebecca Shoichet as Twilight Sparkle (singing voice)
 Tabitha St. Germain as Rarity
 Kazumi Evans as Rarity (singing voice)
 Ashleigh Ball as Applejack and Rainbow Dash
 Andrea Libman as Fluttershy and Pinkie Pie (speaking voice)
 Shannon Chan-Kent as Pinkie Pie (singing voice); Libman occasionally
 Cathy Weseluck as Spike

Recurring 

 Nicole Oliver as Princess Celestia 
 Tabitha St. Germain as Princess Luna
 Britt McKillip as Princess Cadance
 Andrew Francis as Shining Armor
 The Cutie Mark Crusaders
 Michelle Creber as Apple Bloom
 Madeleine Peters as Scootaloo
 Claire Corlett as Sweetie Belle (speaking voice)
 Michelle Creber as Sweetie Belle (singing voice)

Minor 

 Chantal Strand as Diamond Tiara
 Shannon Chan-Kent as Silver Spoon
 Kelly Metzger as Spitfire
 Kathleen Barr as Trixie Lulamoon
 Lee Tockar as Snips
 Richard Ian Cox as Snails
 Brenda Crichlow as Zecora
 Tabitha St. Germain as Granny Smith and Aunt Applesauce
 Peter New as Big McIntosh and Half Baked Apple
 Ashleigh Ball as Apple Rose and Apple Dumpling
 Andrea Libman as Apple Leaves
 Terry Klassen as Apple Split
 John de Lancie as Discord

Guest stars 
 Jim Miller as King Sombra
 Brynna Drummond as Babs Seed
 Britt Irvin as Lightning Dust
 Veena Sood as Ms. Harshwhinny
 Patricia Drake as Ms. Peachbottom

Episodes

Songs

DVD release 
Shout! Factory, which owns the DVD publishing rights for the series within Region 1, released multiple DVDs. Adventures in the Crystal Empire, Pinkie Pie Party, Princess Twilight Sparkle, and A Pony for Every Season were released for Region 1 markets containing episodes from the third season, bundled with episodes from previous seasons. The complete season was released on February 4, 2014.

References

2012 American television seasons
2013 American television seasons
3
2012 Canadian television seasons
2013 Canadian television seasons